Polushkino is a rural locality (a village) in Asovskoye Rural Settlement, Beryozovsky District, Perm Krai, Russia. The population was 198 as of 2010. There are 2 streets.

Geography 
Polushkino is located 33 km southeast of  Beryozovka (the district's administrative centre) by road. Samokhino is the nearest rural locality.

References 

Rural localities in Beryozovsky District, Perm Krai